Cheops or Khufu, was an ancient Egyptian monarch.

Cheops or CHEOPS may also refer to:

 CHEOPS, a space telescope
 Khéops, the stage name of the French disk jockey Éric Mazel
 Cheops, a boulder on the surface of the comet 67P/Churyumov-Gerasimenko